Catalpa × erubescens (or Catalpa erubescens), the hybrid catalpa, is a hybrid plant species of Catalpa in the family Bignoniaceae. It is a medium-sized tree, reaching at most 20m. Its parents are southern catalpa, Catalpa bignonioides, from the United States, and yellow catalpa, C. ovata, from China. There is one accepted form, Catalpa × erubescens Carrière f. purpurea (Wawra & Abel) Paclt, which has purple, some say chocolate-colored, young leaves which turn green as they mature. This form is marketed under a variety of names, such as hybrid catalpa 'Purpurea', red-leaved Indian bean tree, and purple hybrid catalpa, and has gained the Royal Horticultural Society's Award of Garden Merit.

References

erubescens
Ornamental trees
Plants described in 1869
Hybrid plants